San Yuan Li is a 2003 experimental independent Chinese documentary directed and produced by artists Ou Ning and Cao Fei. Focusing on the modern paradox of China's rapid economic growth and social marginalization, the film was shot in San Yuan Li, a rural village nestled in the industrial skyline of Guangzhou. The film examines the effects of development on traditional agrarian lifestyles. San Yuan Li was commissioned for and exhibited at the Venice Biennale in 2003.

Plot synopsis
Armed with video cameras, twelve artists present a highly stylized portrait of San Yuan Li, a traditional village besieged by China's urban sprawl. China's rapid modernization literally traps the village of San Yuan Li within the surrounding skyscrapers of Guangzhou, a city of 12 million people. The villagers move to a different rhythm, thriving on subsistence farming and traditional crafts. They resourcefully reinvent their traditional lifestyle by tending rice paddies on empty city lots and raising chickens on makeshift rooftop coops.

Public screening history 

 2018, exhibition "The Street Where the World is Made", MAXXI, Roma
 2018, exhibition "The D-Tale: Video Art from the Pearl River Delta", Times Art Center Berlin
 2017, exhibition "Canton Express", M+ Pavilion, Hong Kong
 2016, Chinese Visual Festival, London
 2013, Chinese Realities/Documentary Visions, Museum of Modern Art, New York
 2012, The International House, Philadelphia
 2008, Uplink Factory, Tokyo
 2006, A/P/A Institute at New York University
 2006, Center for Architecture, New York
 2006, University of Tokyo
 2006, Kyoto Seika University
 2006, exhibition "Contemporary China: Architecture, Arts and Visual Culture", Museum Boijmans Van Beuningen
 2006, exhibition "Never Go Out Without My DV Cam", Museo Colecciones ICO, Madrid
 2006, exhibition "Guangzhou: Cantonese Artists in the Sigg Collection", Kunstmuseum Bern
 2005, Peabody Essex Museum, Salem, Massachusetts
 2005, School of Oriental and African Studies (SOAS), University of London
 2005, Michael Berger Gallery, Pittsburgh
 2005, exhibition "BEYOND : an extraordinary space of experimentation for modernization", 2nd Guangzhou Triennial, Guangdong Museum of Art 
 2005, exhibition "Kunst und Film", Kunstmuseum Bern
 2005, exhibition "The Wall: Reshaping Contemporary Chinese Art", Millennium Art Museum, Beijing; Albright-Knox Art Gallery, Buffalo; University at Buffalo Art Galleries
 2005, exhibition "Follow Me! Contemporary Chinese Art at the Threshold of the Millennium", Mori Art Museum, Tokyo
 2005, exhibition "Unspeakable Happiness", Museo Tamayo Arte Contemporaneo, Mexico City
 2005, exhibition "Living in Interesting Times: A Decade of New Chinese Photography", The Open Museum of Photography, Tel Hai, Israel
 2005, exhibition "Crossovers and Rewrites: Borders over Asia", World Social Forum 2005, Museum of Contemporary Art, Porte Alegro, Brazil
 2005, 3rd Copenhagen International Documentary Film Festival 
 2005, 29th Hong Kong International Film Festival
 2005, London Chinese Film Festival, SOAS, University of London
 2005, International Short Film Festival, Alliance Francaise, Bangkok
 2004, Taiwan International Documentary Festival
 2004, exhibition "Die Chinesen: Fotografie und Video aus China", Kunstmuseum Wolfsburg
2004, exhibition "The San Yuan Li Project", Courtyard Gallery, Beijing
 2004, exhibition "Tätig Sein", Neue Gesellschaft für Bildende Kunst e.V. (NGBK), Berlin 
 2004, exhibition "Traditions and Contradictions: New Video Works from Asia", Filmtheater't Hoogt, Utrecht; Argos Festival, Brussels
 2004, Seeing China program, Nova Cinema, Brussels
 2004, exhibition "Out the Window: Spaces of Distraction", Asia Center, Japan Foundation, Tokyo; Project Space Zip, Darling Art _Foundation, Seoul
 2004, China Now program, Museum of Modern Art, New York
 2003, exhibition "Fabricated Paradises: Artists from China", La Parvis Contemporary Art Center, Vidéo K 01, Pau, France
 2003, MK2 Bibliothèque, Paris
 2003, 10th Biennial of the Moving Image, Centre pour L'Image Contemporaine Saint-Gervais, Genève
 2003, world premiere, 2003, exhibition "Z.O.U. (Zone of Urgency)", 50th Venice Biennale

References

External links

 Various Reviews - Alternative Archive

Chinese documentary films
Chinese avant-garde and experimental films
2000s avant-garde and experimental films
2003 films
Documentary films about China
Anti-modernist films
2003 documentary films